Fulgencio Yegros y Franco de Torres (born 1780 in Quyquyhó, died 1821) was Paraguayan soldier and first head of state of independent Paraguay. The town of Yegros is named in his honor.

Life 

Yegros was born to a family of military tradition and also pursued a military career. Grandson of governor Fulgencio Yegros y Ledesma, he studied in Asunción and joined the Spanish colonial army. He had his first combat experiences in 1802 against the Portuguese and in 1807 when he was part of the Paraguayan forces that defended Buenos Aires during British invasions of the Río de la Plata. He reached the rank of captain in 1810 and was given the governorship of Misiones. Later he founded the first military academy in independent Paraguay

In early 1811 he participated in Paraguay campaign and defended Paraguay against the invaders led by Manuel Belgrano. 

Yegros and Pedro Juan Caballero were the main military figures in the Revolution of May 1811, which led to the Independence of Paraguay. Following independence, from June 19, 1811 until October 12, 1813 Yegros was President of the five-man ruling Junta Superior Gubernativa which in 1813 was replaced by a two-man consulate. Yegros and José Gaspar Rodríguez de Francia were chosen by Congress in 1813 as Consuls of the Republic following the model of the French Revolution. 

Yegros was more of a military man than politician, and in his role as Consul of Paraguay was marginalised by Francia. His term as Consul was from 12 February 1814 to 12 June 1814. After his last consular term in 1814, Francia was elected the dictator of Paraguay and Yegros retired from public life to his estate.

In 1820 Yegros was a participant in the unsuccessful plot that tried to oust Francia from power. Following the failure of the plot, Yegros was imprisoned and was executed on 17 July, 1821.

References

1780 births
1821 deaths
People from Paraguarí Department
Presidents of Paraguay
Paraguayan people who died in prison custody
Prisoners who died in Paraguayan detention
Paraguayan people of Spanish descent
Paraguayan independence activists
19th-century Paraguayan people